Kenneth James Roche  (born 24 October 1941) is an Australian former hurdler who competed in the 1964 Summer Olympics. He was made an Officer of the Order of Australia in 2004 for services to the development of the construction industry in Australia and a range of related professional organisations, to education, and to the community.

References

1941 births
Living people
Australian male hurdlers
Olympic athletes of Australia
Athletes (track and field) at the 1964 Summer Olympics
Athletes (track and field) at the 1962 British Empire and Commonwealth Games
Athletes (track and field) at the 1966 British Empire and Commonwealth Games
Commonwealth Games gold medallists for Australia
Commonwealth Games medallists in athletics
20th-century Australian people
21st-century Australian people
Medallists at the 1962 British Empire and Commonwealth Games
Medallists at the 1966 British Empire and Commonwealth Games